Lunella viridicallus is a species of sea snail, a marine gastropod mollusk in the family Turbinidae, the turban snails.

Description
The length of the shell attains 3.2 mm.

Distribution
This species occurs in the Red Sea.

References

 Dekker, H. & Orlin, Z. (2000). Checklist of Red Sea Mollusca . Spirula. 47 Supplement : 1-46

External links
 To World Register of Marine Species
  Jousseaume, F. (1898). Description de coquilles nouvelles. Le Naturaliste. ser. 2, 12(280): 251

viridicallus
Gastropods described in 1892